Sawa Lakh Se Ek Ladaun is an Indian period drama film directed and produced by Dara Singh. It featured Dara Singh in the role of Kartar. It was one of the most expensive film made in Punjabi languages. The film was made in both Hindi and Punjabi.

Plot
It was the story of Kartar (Dara Singh) who is born and raised in a Hindu family in Punjab, and who later converts to Sikhism against his parents’ wishes. He joins the rebel-Sikh warriors, and fights the oppressive Mughal army.

Cast 
 Dara Singh
 Navin Nischol
 Rajesh Khanna 
 Neetu Singh

Production 
Pre-production on the film began in 1974. The film was launched in 1975 and was named as Raj Karega Khalsa. However, since Prime Minister Indira Gandhi declared a state of Emergency across the country on 24 June 1975 and since the film contained certain issues like rebellion against ruling government, many people were against making of the film. However, despite troubles, after renaming  the film aa Sawa Lakh Se Ek Ladaun in the year 1975, shooting got completed in the year 1975 and was ready for release in the year 1976. But again the film faced trouble from the censor board of film certification. The film was released successfully in 1976.

Soundtrack

References

External links

 

1976 films
1970s Hindi-language films
Indian historical drama films
Indian epic films
Historical epic films
History of India on film
Films set in the 18th century
Films about royalty
Films about Sikhism
Films set in the Mughal Empire